Amanita magniverrucata, commonly known as great pine jewel, is a species of agaric mushroom in the family Amanitaceae. First described scientifically by American mycologists Harry Delbert Thiers and Joseph Ammirati in 1982, it is mycorrhizal and associates with the tree Pinus radiata.

While its edibility is unknown, it may be poisonous, as are many Amanitas.

See also
List of Amanita species

References

magniverrucata
Fungi of North America
Fungi described in 1982